AMD (Advanced Micro Devices) is an American semiconductor manufacturer.

AMD may also refer to:

Science/technology
 Acid mine drainage
 Age-related macular degeneration of the eye
 Algorithmic mechanism design, a field of economics
 AMD64 CPU architecture
 AMD-65 Automata Módosított Deszantfegyver (Automatic Modified Descent), a Hungarian rifle
 Asynchronous module definition, a JavaScript API
 amd, the Berkeley Automounter, a daemon on Unix-like operating systems
 Alpha-mannosidosis, a lysosomal storage disorder

Business/politics
 Aircraft Manufacturing and Design
 Alliance for a Democratic Mauritania, or Alliance pour une Mauritanie démocratique, a former political movement
 AMD Holdings Inc., an American doll manufacturer
 Certified AM Directional Specialist, in broadcasting
 Armenian dram, ISO 4217 currency code AMD
 Atomic Minerals Directorate for Exploration and Research, Hyderabad, India
 American Micro Devices, a 1964–1965 technology company
 Arbeitsstelle für Molekularelektronik Dresden, a former name for technology company ZMDI

Other
 AMD Academy of Fashion and Design, Germany
 A Modest Destiny, a webcomic by Sean Howard
 Sardar Vallabhbhai Patel International Airport, Ahmedabad, India, IATA code AMD

See also 
 `Amd
 Amdahl